A solid-state electrolyte (SSE) is a solid ionic conductor and electron-insulating material and it is the characteristic component of the solid-state battery. It is useful for applications in electrical energy storage (EES) in substitution of the liquid electrolytes found in particular in lithium-ion battery. The main advantages are the absolute safety, no issues of leakages of toxic organic solvents, low flammability, non-volatility, mechanical and thermal stability, easy processability, low self-discharge, higher achievable power density and cyclability. 
This makes possible, for example, the use of a lithium metal anode in a practical device, without the intrinsic limitations of a liquid electrolyte thanks to the property of lithium dendrite suppression in the presence of a solid-state electrolyte membrane. The utilization of a high capacity anode and low reduction potential, like lithium with a specific capacity of 3860 mAh g−1 and a reduction potential of -3.04 V vs SHE, in substitution of the traditional low capacity graphite, which exhibits a theoretical capacity of 372 mAh g−1 in its fully lithiated state of LiC6, is the first step in the realization of a lighter, thinner and cheaper rechargeable battery. Moreover, this allows the reach of gravimetric and volumetric energy densities, high enough to achieve 500 miles per single charge in an electric vehicle. Despite the promising advantages, there are still many limitations that are hindering the transition of SSEs from academia research to large-scale production, depending mainly on the poor ionic conductivity compared to that of liquid counterparts. However, many car OEMs (Toyota, BMW, Honda, Hyundai) expect to integrate these systems into viable devices and to commercialize solid-state battery-based electric vehicles by 2025.

History 
The first inorganic solid-state electrolytes were discovered by M. Faraday in the nineteenth century, these being silver sulfide (Ag2S) and lead(II) fluoride (PbF2). The first polymeric material able to conduct ions at the solid-state was PEO, discovered in the 1970s by V. Wright. The importance of the discovery was recognized in the early of 1980s.

However, unresolved fundamental issues remain in order to fully understand the behavior of all-solid batteries, especially in the area of electrochemical interfaces. In recent years the needs of safety and performance improvements with respect to the state-of-the-art Li-ion chemistry are making solid-state batteries very appealing and are now considered an encouraging technology to satisfy the need for long range battery electric vehicles of the near future.

In March 2020, the Samsung Advanced Institute of Technology (SAIT) published research on an all-solid-state battery (ASSB) using an argyrodite-based solid-state electrolyte with a demonstrated energy density of 900 Wh L−1 and a stable cyclability of more than 1000 cycles, reaching for the first time a value close to the 1000 Wh L−1.

Properties 
For Solid State Batteries (SSBs) / Solid Electrolytes (SEs) to become a major market challenger it must meet some key performance measurements. The major criteria that an SSB/SE should have are:
 Ionic conductivity: Historically, SSBs have suffered from low ionic conductivities due to poor interfacial kinetics and mobility of ions in general. Hence an SE with a high ionic conductivity is of primary importance. High ionic conductivity (at least higher than 10−4 S cm−1) can be measured through electrochemical impedance spectroscopy (EIS) analysis.
 Volumetric Energy Density: Along with high ionic conductivity the candidate must have the ability to be stacked within a single package, so it supplies high energy density to the Electric Vehicles. A high volumetric energy density is required so that the driving range of EVs can be increased between charges.
 Power density: Sufficient power density (W/L) is needed to make energy available when needed which is also a measure of how quickly charging and discharging can take place.
Cycle life: Long cycle and shelf life are needed as conventional Li-ion batteries degrade after a few years.
Ionic transference number: High ionic transference number (the closest possible to 1) can be measured through a combination of chronoamperometry (CA) and EIS analysis.
Thermal, mechanical and electrochemical Stability: During device or car operation the SSBs may undergo large volume variations and face mechanical stress. Also, electrochemical stability at high operating electrode potentials which are of advantage when it comes to high energy density. Hence, it is important that their mechanical, thermal, and electrochemical stability are considered.  High mechanical strength (at least tens of MPa) can be measured through a traditional tensile test. Wide electrochemical stability windows (ESW) (at least 4-5 V) can be measured through linear sweep voltammetry (LSV) or cyclic voltammetry (CV).
 Compatibility: The SE must be compatible with the electrode materials used in batteries as there is already a high chance of increased resistance in SSBs due to limited contact area between electrolyte and electrode materials. It should also be stable in contact with Lithium metal. It should be lighter so that it can be used in portable electronic devices. High compatibility with the electrode material can be measured through EIS analysis repeated over more consecutive days.
Economic fabrication technologies: If SEs contain expensive materials like Ge it will make the production cost go up significantly. The production of an exemplar SSB will require the convergence of uncomplicated fabrication technologies like particle dispersion, mechanical mixing, film formation etc.
It is hard for one material to fulfill all the above criteria, hence a number of other approaches can be utilized for example a hybrid electrolyte system which combines the advantages of inorganic and polymer electrolytes.

Categories 
SSEs have the same role of a traditional liquid electrolyte and they are classified into all-solid-state electrolyte and quasi-solid-state electrolyte (QSSE). All-solid-state electrolytes are furthermore divided into inorganic solid electrolyte (ISE), solid polymer electrolyte (SPE) and composite polymer electrolyte (CPE). On the other hand, a QSSE, also called gel polymer electrolyte (GPE), is a freestanding membrane that contains a certain amount of liquid component immobilized inside the solid matrix. In general the nomenclatures SPE and GPE are used interchangeably but they have a substantially different ionic conduction mechanism: SPEs conducts ions through the interaction with the substitutional groups of the polymer chains, while GPEs conducts ions mainly in the solvent or plasticizer.

All-solid-state electrolyte 
All-solid-state electrolytes are divided into inorganic solid electrolyte (ISE), solid polymer electrolyte (SPE) and composite polymer electrolyte (CPE). They are solid at room temperature and the ionic movement occurs at the solid-state. Their main advantage is the complete removal of any liquid component aimed to a greatly enhanced safety of the overall device. The main limitation is the ionic conductivity that tends to be much lower compared to a liquid counterpart.

 Inorganic solid electrolyte (ISE)
Inorganic solid electrolyte (ISE) are a particular type of all-solid-state electrolyte that is constituted by an inorganic material in the crystalline or glassy state, that conducts ions by diffusion through the lattice. The main advantages of this class of solid-state electrolyte are the high ionic conductivity (of the order of a few mS cm−2 at room-temperature), high modulus (of the order of GPa) and high transfer number compared to other classes of SSEs. They are generally brittle and with this comes a low compatibility and stability towards the electrode, with a rapidly increasing interfacial resistance and a complicated scale-up from academic to industry. They can be oxides, sulfides or phosphates-based and the crystalline structures include LISICON (lithium superionic conductor) (e.g. LGPS, LiSiPS, LiPS), argyrodite-like (e.g. Li6PS5X, X = Cl, Br, I), garnets (LLZO), NASICON (sodium superionic conductor) (e.g. LTP, LATP, LAGP), lithium nitrides (e.g. Li3N), lithium hydrides (LiBH4), lithium phosphidotrielates  and phoshidotetrelates, perovskites (e.g. lithium lanthanum titanate, "LLTO"), lithium halides (LYC, LYB).,RbAg4I5. Some ISEs can be glass ceramics assuming an amorphous state instead of a regular crystalline structure. Popular examples are lithium phosphorus oxynitride (LIPON) and the lithium thiophosphates (Li2S–P2S5).

 Solid polymer electrolyte (SPE)
Solid polymer electrolyte (SPE) are defined as a solvent-free salt solution in a polymer host material that conducts ions through the polymer chains. Compared to ISEs, SPEs are much easier to process, generally by solution casting, making them greatly compatible with large-scale manufacturing processes. Moreover, they possess higher elasticity and plasticity giving stability at the interface, flexibility and improved resistance to volume changes during operation. A good dissolution of Li salts, low glass transition temperature (Tg), electrochemical compatibility with most common electrode materials, a low degree of crystallinity, mechanical stability, low temperature sensitivity are all characteristics for the ideal SPE candidate. In general though the ionic conductivity is lower than the ISEs and their rate capability is restricted, limiting fast charging. PEO-based SPE is the first solid-state polymer in which ionic conductivity was demonstrated both through inter and intra molecular through ion hopping, thanks to the segmental motion of the polymeric chains because of the great ion complexation capability of the ether groups, but they suffer from the low room-temperature ionic conductivity (10−5 S cm−1) due to the high degree of crystallinity.  The main alternatives to polyether-based SPEs are polycarbonates, polyesters, polynitriles (e.g. PAN), polyalcohols (e.g. PVA), polyamines (e.g. PEI), polysiloxane (e.g. PDMS) and fluoropolymers (e.g. PVDF, PVDF-HFP). Bio-polymers like lignin, chitosan and cellulose are also gaining a lot of interest as standalone SPEs or blended with other polymers, on one side for their environmentally friendliness and on the other for their high complexation capability on the salts. Furthermore, different strategies are considered to increase the ionic conductivity of SPEs and the amorphous-to-crystalline ratio.

With the introduction of particles as fillers inside the polymer solution, a composite polymer electrolyte (CPE) is obtained, the particles can be inert to the Li+ conduction (Al2O3, TiO2, SiO2, MgO, zeolite, montmorillonite, ...), with the sole purpose of reducing the crystallinity, or active (LLTO, LLZO, LATP...) if ISE's particles are dispersed and depending on the polymer/inorganic ratio the nomenclature ceramic-in-polymer and polymer-in-ceramic is often used. Copolymerization, crosslinking, interpenetration, and blending may also be used as polymer/polymer coordination to tune the properties of the SPEs and achieve better performances, introducing in the polymeric chains polar groups like ethers, carbonyls or nitriles drastically improve the dissolution of the lithium salts.

Quasi-solid-state electrolyte 

Quasi solid-state electrolytes (QSSEs) are a wide class of composite compounds consisting of a liquid electrolyte and a solid matrix. This liquid electrolyte serves as a percolating pathway of ion conduction while the solid matrix adds mechanical stability to the material as a whole. As the name suggests, QSSEs can have a range of mechanical properties from strong solid-like materials to those in a paste form. QSSEs can be subdivided into a number of categories including gel polymer electrolytes (GPEs), Ionogel electrolytes, and gel electrolytes (also known as "soggy sand" electrolytes). The most common QSSE, GPEs have a substantially different ionic conduction mechanism than SPEs, which conduct ions through the interaction with the substitutional groups of the polymer chains. Meanwhile, GPEs conduct ions mainly in the solvent, which acts as plasticizer. The solvent acts to increase the ionic conductivity of the electrolyte as well as soften the electrolyte for improved interfacial contact. The matrix of GPEs consist of a polymer network swollen in a solvent that contains the active ions (e.g., Li+, Na+, Mg2+, etc.). This allows for the composite to contain both the mechanical properties of solids and the high transport properties of liquids. A number of polymer hosts have been used in GPEs, including PEO, PAN, PMMA, PVDF-HFP, etc.  The polymers are synthesized with increased porosity to incorporate solvents such as ethylene carbonate (EC), propylene carbonate (PC), diethyl carbonate (DEC), and dimethyl carbonate (DMC). Low molecular weight poly(ethylene glycol) (PEG) or other ethers or aprotic organic solvents with high dielectric constant like dimethylsulfoxide (DMSO) can also be mixed the SPE matrix. UV and thermal cross-linking are useful ways to polymerize in-situ the GPE directly in contact with the electrodes for a perfectly adherent interface. Values of ionic conductivity on the order of 1 mS cm−1 can be easily achieved with GPEs, as demonstrate the numerous research articles published.

Emerging subclasses of QSSEs utilize various matrix materials and solvents. Ionogels, for example utilize ionic liquids as a solvent that has improved safety including non-flammability and stability at high temperatures. Matrix materials in ionogels can vary from polymer materials to inorganic nano-materials. These matrix materials (as with all QSSEs) provide mechanical stability with a storage moduli up to 1 MPa or higher. Meanwhile, these materials can provide ionic conductivities on the order of 1 mS cm−1 without using flammable solvents. However, gel electrolytes (i.e. "soggy sand" electrolytes) can achieve liquid-like ionic conductivities (~ 10 mS cm−1) while being in the solid state. Matrix materials such as SiO2 nanoparticles are typically paired with low viscosity solvents (e.g., ethylene carbonate (EC)) to create a gel, whose properties can be modified based on the matrix loading. Matrix content ranging from 10 to 40 wt% can shift the mechanical properties of the electrolyte from a soft paste into a hard gel. However, a tradeoff between mechanical strength and ionic conductivity as one goes up with changing matrix content the other suffers. Despite this, matrix content in these materials can have added benefits including enhanced lithium transference number due to functionalized matrix materials. These new classes of QSSEs are an active area of research to develop the optimal combination of matrix and solvent.

Opportunities 

The versatility and properties of the solid-state electrolyte widen the possible applications towards high energy density and cheaper battery chemistries that are otherwise prevented by the current state-of-the-art of Li-ion batteries. Indeed, by introducing a SSE in the battery architecture there's the possibility to use metallic lithium as anode material, with the possibility to achieve a high energy density battery thanks to its high specific capacity of 3860 mAh g−1. The utilization of a lithium metal anode (LMA) is prevented in a liquid electrolyte above all because of the dendritic growth of a pure Li electrode that easily cause short circuits after few cycles; other related issues are volume expansions, solid-electrolyte-interface (SEI) reactivity and 'dead' lithium. The usage of a SSE guarantees a homogeneous contact with the metallic lithium electrode and possess the mechanical properties to impede the uncontrolled deposition of Li+ ions during the charging phase. At the same time, a SSE finds very promising application in lithium-sulfur batteries solving the key issue of the polysulfide "shuttle" effect by blocking the dissolution of polysulfide species in the electrolyte that rapidly causes a reduction of capacity.

See also 
 Solid-state battery
 Li-ion battery
 Lithium-sulfur battery
 Research in lithium-ion batteries

References

External links 
Solid-state battery. Retrieved 2020-06-26.

Chemistry
Rechargeable batteries
Battery types